Perfecto "Perf" de Castro (born August 14, 1974) is a Filipino musician currently based in Los Angeles, California best known for having been a celebrated fixture in the Philippine alternative rock scene during the 1990s. During the course of that decade, he was one of the original members of the alternative rock band Rivermaya, founded the band Triaxis, and also collaborated with the seminal Filipino rapper Francis Magalona and Filipino hard rock band Wolfgang, all of which received critical and commercial acclaim. De Castro is also known for being adept at Classical and Flamenco music played on the Ten-string guitar

Life and career
De Castro started learning classical guitar at 13 but switched to electric guitar after less than a year, and spent the next decade learning, playing and teaching electric guitar. He was introduced to the ten-string classical guitar by musician Jose Valdez in 1998, and has since then concentrated on this instrument. He uses a unique tuning adapted from the Valdez tuning.

His most notable awards as a musician include the 1998 Katha Award for Best Rock Instrumental Performance and Composition and the 1998 NU Rock Award for Guitarist of the Year. He is also widely recognized as an acclaimed album producer and sound engineer, with his works including the multi-platinum albums of Wolfgang (“Semenelin”), Francis M (FreeMan and FreeMan II), and Marc Velasco (eponymous). From these, he received numerous accolades, including the Producer of the Year Award in the 1998 NU 107 Rock Awards and the 2001 Awit Award for Best Rap Recording for a song done in collaboration with Magalona.

In 2004, de Castro relocated to Los Angeles, CA where he continues to record, perform and teach the guitar through his website and social media. He also formed a band name RockStallion, with members David Aguirre, Wolf Gemora, Mark Yap, and Raffy Mendoza. 

In 2006, de Castro produced a benefit album called "Leyte: The Benefit CD". It consists of compilation of songs from Filipino and Filipino-American artists aimed at helping the victims of the 2006 Southern Leyte mudslide and the proceeds went to relief organizations in the Philippines, such as the Philippine National Red Cross and the Department of Social Welfare and Development, to fund their relief efforts to the people affected by the Leyte mudslide disaster. 

On January 9, 2016, de Castro re-united with his former Rivermaya co-members, Nathan Azarcon, Mark Escueta and Rico Blanco for a "secret mini semi-reunion", following his gig at 19 East, Taguig.

On September 7, 2018, de Castro performed in the launching of the Hollywood Wish Bus at Universal CityWalk with 90s OPM band Introvoys and Robin Nievera, the DJ for The Roadshow program of Wish 107.5.

In February 2021 he collaborated with Gloc 9 in his latest album on the song "Payong".

Awards
 
 1998 NU 107 Rock Awards Guitarist of the Year (won)
 1998 NU 107 Rock Awards Producer of the Year (nominated)
 1998 Katha Award for Best Instrumental Performance and Arrangement for “Perf’s Boogie”, Triaxis
 January 1999 Artist of the Month, VirtualTunes.com
 3rd place 1999 NAMCYA Classical Guitar Category C
 January 2000 Artist of the Month, Musiko.com
 2001 Awit Award for Best Rap Recording, “Luv 4 Lyf”, Francis M artist and co-producer.

Discography
 
as a performer
 1994 RiverMaya, Rivermaya, BMG Pilipinas
 1995 FreeMan, Francis M., BMG Pilipinas (guest artist)
 1995 Semenelin, Wolfgang, Epic / Sony Music (guest artist)
 1996 Further Down the Bend, Triaxis, Epic/Sony Music
 1997 The Shadowland Deep, Backdraft, NEO/Viva Records (guest artist)
 1998 Who We Are, Triaxis, Epic / Sony Music
 1999 Marc Velasco, Marc Velasco, Epic/Sony Music (guest artist)
 2000 Nescafe Open Up Party, various artists/Mike Hanopol, Mike Hanopol, BMG Pilipinas (guest artist)
 2000 FreeMan 2, Francis M, BMG Pilipinas (guest artist)
 2001 Impressions, Nonoy Zuñiga, Columbia / Sony Music (guest artist)
 2006 A Journey Through Ten Strings, Perfecto de Castro, Independent release
 2006 Leyte: The Benefit Album, Independent release
 2009 Caparison, Perfecto de Castro, Independent release
 2021 Poot at Pag-ibig, Gloc 9, Independent release

as a producer
 1994 RiverMaya , Rivermaya, BMG Pilipinas
 1995 Semenelin, Wolfgang, Epic / Sony Music
 1996 Further Down the Bend, Triaxis, Epic / Sony Music
 1997 The Shadowland Deep, Backdraft, NEO/Viva Records
 1998 Who We Are, Triaxis, Epic / Sony Music
 1999 Marc Velasco, Marc Velasco, Epic / Sony Music
 2000 FreeMan 2, Francis M., BMG Pilipinas
 2001 Impressions, Nonoy Zuñiga, Columbia / Sony Music (guest artist)
 2006 A Journey Through Ten Strings, Perfecto de Castro, Independent release
 2006 Leyte: The Benefit Album, Independent release
 2009 Caparison'', Perfecto de Castro, Independent release

References

External links
  
 Perf de Castro, The Pinoy Rocker interview
 Perf de Castro discography
https://news.google.com/newspapers?nid=8cBNEdFwSQkC&dat=19960925&printsec=frontpage&hl=en
https://web.archive.org/web/20051221105548/http://www.philmusic.com/blog/index.php?p=22
https://web.archive.org/web/20090409181827/http://philmusic.com/main/content/view/66/1/
https://news.google.com/newspapers?id=6mUVAAAAIBAJ&sjid=0goEAAAAIBAJ&pg=1874%2C1977545
https://news.google.com/newspapers?id=bWwVAAAAIBAJ&sjid=TwsEAAAAIBAJ&pg=4485%2C3364256
https://news.google.com/newspapers?id=-GUVAAAAIBAJ&sjid=0goEAAAAIBAJ&pg=6220%2C4332296

1974 births
Living people
Filipino guitarists
Filipino rock guitarists
Filipino classical guitarists
Lead guitarists
Filipino rock musicians
Music educators
Rivermaya members
Filipino emigrants to the United States